High School of Fashion Industries (HSFI) is a secondary school located in Manhattan, New York City, New York. HSFI serves grades 9 through 12 and is a part of the New York City Department of Education. HSFI has magnet programs related to fashion design, fashion art, marketing and visual merchandising, graphics and illustration and photography.

Admissions 
Admission to HSFI is highly selective. Students must complete an application to the Board of Education, take the school's exam that includes an art aptitude test, and submit a portfolio. Students are not expected to have formal training in the arts, and many students apply who have little drawing abilities. For prospective students, the school offers pamphlets in most junior high schools and several open house events during the year that include a mock school day with two 45-minute classes.

Student body
The school had a total of 1,743 students during the 2004–2005 school year.
 56% were Hispanic
 39% were African-American
 15% were White
 4% were Asian
 Less than 1% were Native Americans
 In the 2017–18 school year, it may be more accurate to say 55% Hispanic, 40% African American, 2% White, and 3% Asian.

Athletics 
The High School of Fashion Industries is the home of the Falcons:
Basketball Girls Varsity
Basketball Boys Varsity
Bowling Boys Varsity
Bowling Girls Varsity
Indoor Track Girls Varsity
Outdoor Track Girls Varsity
Softball Girls Varsity
Volleyball Girls Varsity
Volleyball Boys Varsity
Girls Wrestling
 Co-Ed Stunts Varsity

History 

Founded in 1926.  In March, 1926, Mr Mortimer C. Ritter, with Miss Jessie R. Dutton and Mr. Federick G. Bruck came to the third floor loft of the Greeley Arcade Building and with two classes, one in dressmaking and the other in garment cutting, organized what was to develop into the Central Needle Trades High School.

The school building was completed in 1941 as the Central High School of Needle Trades.

Auditorium murals 
These murals were painted between 1939 and 1940 by Ernest Fiene. and have landmark status. Construction of the murals (and the school building) were part of the US federal government's Works Progress Administration (WPA) program. The murals "[portray] in dramatic and moving fashion the long generation of hope and despair, and the high standard of social and industrial accomplishment in the needle trades."

Notable alumni
Antonio Fargas, actor, comedian 
Frank Hewitt, jazz pianist
Hank Whitney, professional basketball player
Kerby Jean-Raymond, fashion designer

References

Art schools in New York City
Public high schools in Manhattan
Fashion schools in the United States
Educational institutions established in 1941
Magnet schools in New York (state)
Chelsea, Manhattan
Fashion industry
1941 establishments in New York City